Langston Hughes (1902–1967) was an American poet, social activist, novelist, playwright, and columnist.

These places were named in memorial to him:

 Langston Hughes High School, a public secondary school in Fairburn, Georgia
 Langston Hughes Performing Arts Center, an arts venue in Seattle, Washington
 Langston Hughes, Baltimore, a neighborhood in Baltimore, Maryland